Oulart–The Ballagh is a Gaelic Athletic Association club in County Wexford, Ireland. The club takes its players primarily from the area around the villages of Oulart and The Ballagh. The club has won the Wexford Senior Hurling Championship on 13 occasions, most recently in 2016. Their main rivals are Buffers Alley. Former hurlers, associated with the club, include former Wexford manager Liam Dunne and current Oulart–The Ballagh senior manager Martin Storey.

History
Oulart–The Ballagh were the opponents of Mount Leinster Rangers in the final of the 2013 Leinster Senior Club Hurling Championship when Mount Leinster Rangers became the first club from Carlow to win the title.

Camogie
Oulart–The Ballagh won the All-Ireland Senior Club Camogie Championship in 2011-12 They previously won the Leinster senior club championships in 2009 and 2010.

Honours

Wexford Senior Hurling Championship
Winners: 1994, 1995, 1997, 2004, 2005, 2007, 2009, 2010, 2011, 2012, 2013, 2015, 2016
Leinster Senior Club Hurling Championship
Runners-Up: 1994, 1995, 2010, 2011, 2012, 2013
Winners: 2015
Wexford Intermediate Hurling Championship
Winners: 1968, 2022
Wexford Junior Hurling Championship
Winners: 1967, 2005
Wexford Under-21 Hurling Championship
Winners: 2001, 2003, 2004, 2006, 2013
Winners while combined with Buffers Alley: 1965, 1966
Wexford Minor Hurling Championship
Winners: 1999, 2002, 2003, 2005, 2015
Winners while combined with Buffers Alley: 1967

Notable players
Stephen Doyle
Liam Dunne
Paul Finn
Christy Jacob
Michael Jacob
James Crean
Mick Jacob
Rory Jacob
Shaun Murphy
Des Mythen
Adam Nolan
Jimmy Prendergast
Lar Prendergast
David Redmond
Paul Roche
Keith Rossiter
Garrett Sinnott
Darren Stamp
Martin Storey
Una Leacy
Mary Leacy
Ciara Storey
Karen Atkinson
Colleen Atkinson
Stacey Redmond

References

Gaelic games clubs in County Wexford
Hurling clubs in County Wexford